Aqcheh Qaleh (also Romanized as Āqcheh Qal‘eh, Aghcheh Ghal’eh, Agja Qal‘eh, and Āqjeh Qal‘eh) is a village in Abgarm Rural District, Abgarm District, Avaj County, Qazvin Province, Iran. At the 2006 census, its population was 117, in 31 families.

References 

Populated places in Avaj County